Stefano Sibaldi (June 11, 1905 – July 2, 1996) was an Italian actor and voice actor.

Biography
Born in Livorno, Sibaldi was considered to be among the most successful of the early actors and dubbers of the 20th century. He began his acting career in 1928 staying within the field of stage and screen and he worked alongside many related people within his ventures such as Carlo Veneziani and Armando Falconi. Sibaldi's film debut was in the 1934 film Full Speed and he also made radio and television acting contributions.

In 1937, Sibaldi entered a career as a voice dubber. Among the actors he dubbed included Frank Sinatra, Glenn Ford, Louis de Funès, Fred Astaire, Richard Widmark, Groucho Marx, Danny Kaye and many more. In his Italian dubbed animated roles, he voiced Timothy Q. Mouse in Dumbo, Captain Hook in Peter Pan, Tramp in Lady and the Tramp and the Cheshire Cat in Alice in Wonderland. Sibaldi retired from his career in the late 1980s.

Death
Sibaldi died in Rome on July 2, 1996 at the age of 91.

Filmography

Cinema
Full Speed (1934)
Sette giorni all'altro mondo (1936)
Adam's Tree (1936)
Pensaci, Giacomino! (1936)
The Fornaretto of Venice (1939)
Frenesia (1939)
An Impossible Family (1940)
 Then We'll Get a Divorce (1940)
Don Pasquale (1940)
Il carnevale di Venezia (1940)
Manovre d'amore (1941)
Barbablù (1941)
L'attore scomparso (1941)
La fuggitiva (1941)
Il vagabondo (1941)
Il pozzo dei miracoli (1941)
Wedding Day (1942)
Colpi di timone (1942)
Labbra serrate (1942)
L'amico delle donne (1943)
Annabella's Adventure (1943)
Il nemico (1943)
Silenzio, si gira! (1943)
4 ragazze sognano (1943)
La signora in nero (1943)
Lascia cantare il cuore (1943)
 Mist on the Sea (1944)
L'uomo dal guanto grigio (1948)
Rascel-Fifì (1957)
Il corazziere (1960)
Mission Stardust (1967)

References

External links

1905 births
1996 deaths
People from Livorno
Italian male voice actors
Italian male stage actors
Italian male television actors
Italian male film actors
Italian male radio actors
20th-century Italian male actors